Medieșu Aurit is a commune of 7,299 residents in Satu Mare County, Romania. It is composed of seven villages:

The villages Băbășești and Potău were flooded by the Someș during the 1970 floods.

Demographics
Ethnic groups (2002 census): 
Romanians: 78.50%
Hungarians: 18.44%
Romanies (Gypsies): 2.53%

According to mother tongue, 21.06% of the population speak Hungarian as their first language.

References

Communes in Satu Mare County